Tucupita José Marcano (born September 16, 1999) is a Venezuelan professional baseball infielder for the Pittsburgh Pirates of Major League Baseball (MLB). He has previously played in MLB for the San Diego Padres.

Career

San Diego Padres
On July 2, 2016, Marcano signed with the San Diego Padres as an international free agent. Marcano made his professional debut in 2017 with the Dominican Summer League Padres, slashing .206/.337/.353 in 49 games. In 2018, Marcano split the season between the AZL Padres and the Low-A Tri-City Dust Devils, accumulating a .366/.450/.438 slash line with 1 home run and 26 RBI. The following season, Marcano played with the Single-A Fort Wayne TinCaps, hitting .270/.323/.337 with 2 home runs and 45 RBI in 111 games with the team. Marcano did not play in a game in 2020 due to the cancellation of the minor league season because of the COVID-19 pandemic. The Padres added him to their 40-man roster after the 2020 season.

On April 1, 2021, Marcano made his MLB debut as a pinch hitter for Keone Kela, and drew a walk against Stefan Crichton of the Arizona Diamondbacks. On April 6, Marcano collected his first major league hit, a single off of San Francisco Giants reliever Wandy Peralta. After going 2-for-12 with an RBI in 10 games for the Padres, Marcano was optioned off the roster and assigned to the Triple-A El Paso Chihuahuas to begin the minor league season.

Pittsburgh Pirates
On July 26, 2021, Marcano was traded to the Pittsburgh Pirates along with Jack Suwinski and Michell Miliano in exchange for Adam Frazier.

Marcano finished the season with the Indianapolis Indians, then began the 2022 campaign with the Altoona Curve. He appeared in one game in April against the Milwaukee Brewers in April as a pinch hitter, and was recalled to the major leagues on May 27. He hit his first MLB home run off of Dodgers pitcher Walker Buehler on May 30.

Personal life
Tucupita Marcano was named after his birthplace, the Venezuelan city of Tucupita. Tucupita is also his father Raul's nickname.

References

External links

1999 births
Living people
Major League Baseball players from Venezuela
Venezuelan expatriate baseball players in the United States
Major League Baseball infielders
San Diego Padres players
Pittsburgh Pirates players
Dominican Summer League Padres players
Venezuelan expatriate baseball players in the Dominican Republic
Arizona League Padres players
Tri-City Dust Devils players
Fort Wayne TinCaps players
El Paso Chihuahuas players
People from Tucupita
Altoona Curve players
Indianapolis Indians players